Dulip Kapila Liyanage (born 6 June 1972) is a former Sri Lankan cricketer. He is a left-handed batsman and a right-arm medium-fast bowler. He studied at the Kalutara Vidyalaya.

International career
Liyanage made his Test debut in the same Test as Muttiah Muralitharan in 1992–93, and when bowling, captured the wicket of Tom Moody with his third ball. He went wicketless during the summers against India in 1993–94, and didn't return until 1997. Following this he played in several One-day internationals before injury in Pakistan ruled him out again.

He along with Kumar Dharmasena set the record for the highest 8th wicket stand for Sri Lanka in ODI cricket (91).

Domestic career
Dulip continued to dominate in first class cricket representing Colts Cricket Club in Colombo, Sri Lanka as an attacking All-Rounder, which earned him the opportunity of representing Sri Lanka in Hong Kong International Cricket Sixes tournament(2003) as Captain/Manager. He made his Twenty20 debut on 17 August 2004, for Colts Cricket Club in the 2004 SLC Twenty20 Tournament.

References

1972 births
Living people
Sri Lanka One Day International cricketers
Sri Lanka Test cricketers
Sri Lankan cricketers
Basnahira South cricketers
Colts Cricket Club cricketers